Harold T. Dennis (born 1903) was a professional footballer who played as a defender for Newark Town, Grantham Town, Huddersfield Town and Southend United. He was born in Romsey, Hampshire.

References
 Alan Hodgson - Huddersfield Town F.C. Matchday Programme - 2007-08 season

1903 births
Year of death missing
People from Romsey
English footballers
Association football defenders
English Football League players
Grantham Town F.C. players
Huddersfield Town A.F.C. players
Southend United F.C. players
Newark Town F.C. players